Agapios Vrikkīs (born 3 May 2001) is a Cypriot professional footballer who plays as a midfielder for Italian club Mestre.

Career 
Vrikkīs made his debut for Catania on 7 March 2021, in a 3–0 win against Casertana.

On 3 August 2021, he joined Manzanese in the fifth-tier Eccellenza. A month later, he moved to Luparense in Serie D. On 4 November 2021, he transferred for the third time in 3 months, joining Serie D club Mestre.

External links

References 

2001 births
Sportspeople from Nicosia
Living people
Cypriot footballers
Cyprus youth international footballers
Association football midfielders
APOEL FC players
Torino F.C. players
Calcio Padova players
S.S.C. Napoli players
Catania S.S.D. players
A.C. Mestre players
Serie C players
Serie D players
Cypriot expatriate footballers
Expatriate footballers in Italy
Cypriot expatriate sportspeople in Italy